The Murring–Kuric languages are a family  of mainly extinct Australian Aboriginal languages that existed in the south east of Australia.

They belong in the Pama–Nyungan family. These languages are divided into the Yuin, Kuri, and Yora groups, although exact classifications vary between researchers.  Yuin–Kuric languages were spoken by the original inhabitants of what are now the cities of Sydney and Canberra. Most are now extinct.

The koala is named from the word gula for the animal in the Dharug language, a Murring–Kuri language within the Yora group, and the same word occurs in other Yuin–Kuri languages, such as Gundungurra, within the Yuin group.

, Yuin is listed as one of 20 languages prioritised as part of the Priority Languages Support Project, being undertaken by First Languages Australia and funded by the Department of Communications and the Arts. The project aims to "identify and document critically-endangered languages — those languages for which little or no documentation exists, where no recordings have previously been made, but where there are living speakers".

Languages
The constituent languages are groups are arranged from southwest to northeast:

Yuin group
The Yuin (southern) group includes:

 The extinct Tharawal languages spoken along the South Coast of New South Wales, including Thawa, Dyirringany, Thurga, Tharawal, and possibly Gweagal.
 Nyamudy language spoken by people around Canberra
 Ngarigo (Ngarigu) spoken by the Ngarigo people
 Ngunnawal, also known as Gundungurra (Gundungura, Gudungura, or Gandangara), spoken by the Ngunnawal people and Gandangara people in inland south-eastern New South Wales in the now Yass region.

Yora group

The Yora or Iyora (central) group is accepted by Dixon.

 Dharug, an extinct language which attempts are being made to revive.
 Darkinjung, an extinct language.

They were spoken in the region of Sydney.

Kuri group
The Kuri (northern) group has been reduced to its southernmost languages:

 Worimi languages: Worimi (Worimi, Katthang, Birrpayi), Awabakal
 Dunghutti language

Languages once classified as Kuric include Yugambal, Yuggarabul (Yuggera), and Nganyaywana (Anaiwan) further north.

Comparison
Jeremy Steele's partial reconstruction of the Sydney language includes a comparison of pronouns in several Yuin–Kuric languages. The following partial and simplified version shows some of the similarities and differences across the family:

References

 
Extinct languages of New South Wales